Fayek 'Adly 'Azb Gobran (26 May 1958 – October 2021) was an Egyptian boxer. He competed in the men's flyweight event at the 1984 Summer Olympics.

He won a gold medal at the 1979 Mediterranean Games, and won silver at the 1983 Mediterranean Games after losing against Brahim Brahimi. In the Olympics, he competed for his home country, but was subsequently defeated by Heo Yong-Mo.

References

1958 births
2021 deaths
Egyptian male boxers
Olympic boxers of Egypt
Boxers at the 1984 Summer Olympics
Place of birth missing
Flyweight boxers
20th-century Egyptian people